The White Swan Inn is a hotel at 845 Bush Street in the Nob Hill neighborhood of San Francisco, California, United States. It was established, along with an adjacent sister property named Petite Auberge, by "an eccentric aunt" in the 1950s after she married a wealthy local man. Both properties have 26 guestrooms and were renovated in 2018.

References

External links
 White Swan Inn official website
 View of the building from Bush Street – Google Street View, March 2021

Hotels in San Francisco
Hotels established in the 1950s
Nob Hill, San Francisco